The Curașița is a left tributary of the river Valea Țiganului in Romania. It discharges into the Valea Țiganului near Recaș.

References

Rivers of Romania
Rivers of Timiș County